Emmanuel Earl Ankrah professionally known as Earl Ankrah is a Ghanaian former national television show host; and currently a policy communications practitioner.

Education 
Earl Ankrah attended Accra Academy, where he was a chapel prefect; the Ghana Institute of Journalism, where he obtained a Diploma in Journalism; the Graduate School of Management (UK and Accra campuses) where he took a graduate course in Public Relations and then the National Institute for Labour Economics Research and Development, New Delhi, where he read an MA in Human Resource Planning and Development.

Career
Earl Ankrah is widely acknowledged as the creator and pioneer of breakfast television in Ghana. He was the originator and co-host of the Ghana Broadcasting Corporation's The Breakfast Show. In his very early stages on television, Earl introduced a flexible and engaging presentation style that won him admiration and earned him coveted awards. His fluid chemistry with his co-anchor Akushika Acquaye, sparked rumours in the country about them being in a relationship. Earl Ankrah is idolized by Ghanaian celebrity, including award-winning television anchors who refer to him as "Legendary Earl Ankrah", he's the originator and host of the Ghana Broadcasting Corporation's Breakfast Show in the 90s. In 2006, Ankrah hosted EA Live!, an avant-garde magazine talk programme, which he purposed to run for one season only.

Earl Ankrah is currently the Ag. Director for Research, Monitoring & Evaluation and Head of Public Affairs at Fair Wages and Salaries Commission, (the state organisation responsible for determining and negotiating salaries of public sector employees in Ghana), under the Ministry of Employment and Labour Relations. He has played a pivotal role in the implementation of the Single Spine Pay Policy and the management of Government-Labour relations. His works with the Ministry, which involve high-level negotiations and partnerships with Labour Unions, have taken him close to world leaders like British Prime Minister Theresa May, French President Emanuel Macron and Luxembourg Prime Minister Xavier Bettel.

Earl is also an avid writer on a broad spectrum of issues, through an entertaining play on words and sharp wit. His articles seek to pivot public attention away from entrenched biases and stagnant norms, towards more open-minded, progressive and realistic new-day approaches to divisive issues around the world (especially in Ghana and the United States). In some of his writings, like "Blue's Clues", he nudged then US President-Elect Joe Biden not to try too hard to win Republican support, in his bid to fulfil his campaign promises, as that is highly likely to prove futile; but rather tap into his real "rough Joe" self to achieve rapid results, before his term runs out. In "The Trial of Donald J. Trump", Ankrah criticises the irony of American democracy, which makes a series of constitutional provisions (between election day and June 6), that permit Trump to overturn election results; yet he's vilified for attempting to do so. In "Gunsmoke and Mirrors", he criticised Ghana's security agencies and the judiciary for the "clumsy" conviction and incarceration of Charles Antwi (a mentally unstable man), who had confessed his intent to assassinate the President of Ghana. Ankrah's article, supported the efforts of others who took legal action, leading to the release of the convict from BNI custody.

He has also done some marketing consultancy for Best Western Premiere (Airport Hotel) in Accra.

Advocacy 
Given his journalism background, Earl Ankrah is drawn to a varied number of interests that he advocates public and government attention for. He is an advocate for women’s and children’s rights, through works at Ghana’s Ministry of Employment and Labour Relations. He also promotes civil liberties, environmental protection concerns. He champions the need to exercise political neutrality in judgement and decision making. In 2020, he defended two high-level politicians of different political lineages: Information Minister, Kojo Oppong Nkrumah (of the New Patriotic Party) and Vice Presidential Candidate Professor Jane Naana Opoku Agyemang (of the National Democratic Congress), both of whom were former radio presenters, who moderated the 2012 Presidential Debate. They came under public backlash in 2020, for moderating the debate (back in 2012) whiles harboring political ambitions. Ankrah also advocates for the development of the arts in Ghana. He has called for the honoring of persons who have contributed to the growth of Hiplife music, one of whom is the CEO of Ohenemedia, Abraham Ohene Djan. Earl also promotes women's and children's rights, encourages creative photography and aesthetic architecture. Earl has previously managed and mentored some Ghanaian music heartthrobs, including Okyeame Kwame, Kontihene and Ded Buddy and among others. In year 2000, Ankrah led Akyeame to perform at the Apollo Theater and DAR Constitution Hall.

Awards 
 
|-

|-
|| 2019  ||| ECOWAS (ECREEE) || ECOWAS Center for Renewable Energy and Energy Efficiency (Recognition)  || 
|-
|| 2002  ||| Promoting Ghana Tourism || Tourism Award || 
|-
|| 2002  ||| Viewers Choice || RTV TV Personality of the Year || 
|-
|| 2001 ||| Viewers Choice || RTV TV Personality of the Year 2001 || 
|-
|| 1997 ||| Radio & TV Reviews (Magazine) || TV’s Favorite Face 1997 || 
|}

References

External links 

 
 
 
 Some writings by Earl Ankrah

Ghanaian television presenters
Year of birth missing (living people)
Living people